The Golf Specialist is a 1930 pre-Code comedy short subject from RKO Pictures, starring W. C. Fields. It was his first talkie. The film was shot in Fort Lee, New Jersey when many early film studios in America's first motion picture industry were based there in the early part of the  20th century.

The film features lines such as "I would never hit a woman, not even my own mother" and "Stand clear and keep your eye on the ball", a line Fields also used in the golf scene in The Dentist (1932).  Fields had first performed his golf routine on film in his silent feature So's Your Old Man (1926) and reprised it in that film's sound remake, You're Telling Me! (1934).

Plot
In a Florida hotel, the House Detective's wife likes to flirt with other men. The House Detective catches her flirting with a man, and he bodily throws him out.

Deep Sea McGurk comes in and asks the Desk Clerk for J. Effingham Bellweather, but he is not in. McGurk dictates a note for the Desk Clerk to give to Bellweather that he wants to collect the money that is owed to him.

Bellweather enters, and the Desk Clerk gives him the note from McGurk, which he tears up.  After brief encounters with a bratty little girl and the House Detective, Bellweather offers to teach the Detective's Wife how to play golf.

The two of them and their Caddy go out to the golf course, but Bellweather never gets to hit the ball. He is continuously interrupted by such distractions as the incompetent Caddy's squeaking shoes, the wind blowing papers into his path, and accidentally stepping into a pie that the Caddy had brought.

Finally, the Sheriff and the House Detective come out to the course to arrest con artist Bellweather for a list of absurd crimes (including "eating spaghetti in public", "jumping board bill in seventeen lunatic asylums", "failure to pay installments on a strait-jacket", and "possessing a skunk"); the police put handcuffs on him just as he's showing the Detective's Wife the importance of keeping the wrists close together while gripping the club.

Cast

W.C. Fields as J. Effingham Bellweather
Johnny Kane as Walter, the Hotel Desk Clerk
John Dunsmuir as House Detective
Shirley Grey as House Detective's Wife
William Black as Deep Sea McGurk 
Naomi Casey as Bratty Little Girl
Allen Wood as Caddy
Harriet MacGibbon as Woman Walking Dog

Notes
 The Golf Specialist is one of three W. C. Fields short films that fell into the public domain after the copyright lapsed in the 1960s (the other two being The Dentist, 1932, and The Fatal Glass of Beer, 1933). As such, these three films frequently appear on inexpensive video or DVD compilations.

References

External links

1930 comedy films
1930 films
1930 short films
American black-and-white films
American comedy short films
Golf films
Films shot in Fort Lee, New Jersey
Films with screenplays by W. C. Fields
RKO Pictures short films
Public domain
1930s English-language films
Films directed by Monte Brice
1930s American films